Taksim Square, situated in Beyoğlu in the European part of Istanbul, Turkey, is a major tourist and leisure district famed for its restaurants, shops, and hotels. It is considered the heart of modern Istanbul, with the central station of the Istanbul Metro network. Taksim Square is also the location of the Republic Monument which was crafted by Pietro Canonica and inaugurated in 1928. The monument commemorates the 5th anniversary of the foundation of the Republic of Turkey in 1923, following the Turkish War of Independence.

The square is flanked to the south by The Marmara Hotel, to the east by the Atatürk Cultural Centre, to the north by Gezi Park and to the west by Taksim Mosque. Several major roads converge on the square: Gümüşsuyu Caddesi, Cumhuriyet Caddesi, Tarlabaşı Bulvarı, İstiklal Caddesi and Sıraselviler Caddesi.

History

The word Taksim means "division" or "distribution" in Arabic. Taksim Square was originally the point where the main water lines from the north of Istanbul were collected and branched off to other parts of the city (hence the name.) This use for the area was established by Sultan Mahmud I. The square takes its name from the Ottoman era stone reservoir which is located along one side of the square. 

Another significant building that once stood on the square was the 19th century Taksim Artillery Barracks (Taksim Kışlası, which later became the Taksim Stadium), but which was demolished in 1940 during the construction works in accordance with the plans of French architect and city planner Henri Prost for Taksim Square and Taksim Gezi Park. 

Taksim Gezi Park is a small green park in the midst of the concrete expanse of central Istanbul. In 2013, the city municipality, wanting to rebuild the old barracks as a shopping venue on the site of the park, began forcefully removing protesters who had set up camp in the park. After news spread of the police brutality, thousands of people rallied in the Occupy Taksim movement, to stop the demolition of the park. As of 2013, the status of the demolition project was in limbo, the Justice and Development Party (AKP) government has the Police stationed in and around Taksim Square ready with riot control equipment to deter any large demonstrations.

Present day

Taksim is a main transportation hub and a popular destination for both tourists and residents of Istanbul. İstiklal Caddesi (Independence Avenue), a long pedestrian shopping street, ends at this square, and a nostalgic tram runs from the square along the avenue, ending near the Tünel (1875) which is the world's second-oldest subway line after London's Underground (1863). In addition to serving as the main transfer point for the municipal bus system, Taksim Square is also the terminus of the Hacıosman-4. Levent-Taksim-Yenikapı subway line of the Istanbul Metro.

Taksim's position was given an extra boost on June 29, 2006, when the new Kabataş-Taksim Funicular line F1 connecting the Taksim Metro station with the Kabataş tramway station and Seabus port was opened, allowing people to ascend to Taksim in just 110 seconds.

Surrounding Taksim Square are numerous travel agencies, hotels, restaurants, pubs, and international fast food chains such as Pizza Hut, McDonald's, Subway, and Burger King. It is also home to some of Istanbul's grandest hotels including the InterContinental, the Divan, and The Marmara Hotel. Taksim used to be a favourite location for public events such as parades, New Year celebrations, and other social gatherings, although since 2016 permission has rarely been given for such gatherings. 

Atatürk Cultural Center (Atatürk Kültür Merkezi), a multi-purpose concert hall and cultural centre reopened after renovation in 2021, is also located in Taksim Square. It faces the Taksim Square Mosque which also opened 2021.

Demonstrations and incidents
The square used to be an important venue for political protests.  

 On February 16, 1969, some 150 leftist demonstrators were injured during clashes with right wing groups in what is known as "Bloody Sunday".
 In the events known as the Taksim Square massacre, 36 left-wing demonstrators were killed by unidentified and allegedly right-wing gunmen on the square during the Labour Day demonstrations of May 1, 1977.
 On 10 August 1982, Artin Penik, a Turkish Armenian, set himself on fire to protest the Esenboga airport attack by the Armenian Secret Army for the Liberation of Armenia.
 Taksim Square was the location of football riots in 2000 when two Leeds United fans were stabbed to death during clashes with Galatasaray fans, the night before the 1999-2000 UEFA Cup semi-final first leg match between the two teams.
 On October 31, 2010, a suicide bomb went off next to a police bus. The bomber, a TAK militant, died, while 15 police officers and 17 civilians were injured.

 A march to protest the Circassian genocide took place in May 2011.

Following many other violent incidents, all protests and demonstrations were banned and today police units maintain a round-the-clock presence to prevent any incidents. It is many years since either May Day or New Year's Day events were permitted to take place in the square, with much of the surrounding area usually fenced off for the day and the Metro station often closed to prevent people gathering.

Gezi Park protests

In 2013, protests took place in Taksim in opposition to the reconstruction of the Ottoman era Taksim Military Barracks (demolished in 1940 to create Gezi Park) and a shopping centre on the site of Gezi Park. In the early morning of May 31, police forces moved in on the demonstrators and people sleeping in tents, and tried to disperse them with tear gas, pepperspray and water cannons.

The demonstrators criticized Prime Minister (now President) Recep Tayyip Erdoğan for his uncompromising stance on this controversial issue and for the Turkish police's excessive use of force against the demonstrators.

The large number of trees in the forests of northern Istanbul that were cut down to provide access to the Yavuz Sultan Selim Bridge (Third Bosphorus Bridge) and the new Istanbul International Airport (the world's largest airport) were other factors that triggered the Gezi Park protests. According to official Turkish government data, a total of 2,330,012 trees have been cut down to make way for the airport and its road connections; while a further 381,096 trees were cut down to make way for the highways leading to the Yavuz Sultan Selim Bridge.

Gallery

References

National squares
Squares in Istanbul
Tourism in Istanbul
Architecture in Turkey
Beyoğlu
Entertainment districts in Turkey
Transit centers in Istanbul